Poecilanthe ovalifolia is a species of flowering plant in the family Fabaceae. It is found only in Suriname.

References

Brongniartieae
Flora of Suriname
Vulnerable plants
Taxonomy articles created by Polbot